is a Japanese footballer who plays for Kagoshima United FC.

Club statistics
Updated to 23 February 2017.

References

External links

Profile at Kagoshima United FC

1987 births
Living people
Tokai Gakuen University alumni
Association football people from Kagoshima Prefecture
Japanese footballers
J3 League players
Japan Football League players
FC Kariya players
Kagoshima United FC players
Association football midfielders